Cayetunya is a genus of leaf beetles in the subfamily Eumolpinae. It is known from Central and South America. It was first described by the Czech entomologist Jan Bechyné in 1958.

Most species in this genus are known to display strong sexual dimorphism, such that males and females could be mistaken for separate genera. The female of C. clarki is unknown.

Species
 Cayetunya breesei Bechyné, 1958 – Trinidad, Venezuela
 Cayetunya clarki Flowers, 1997 – Venezuela
 Cayetunya colombiana Flowers, 1997 – Colombia
 Cayetunya consanguinea (Blake, 1976) – Panama
 Cayetunya tifferae Flowers, 1997 (incorrectly formed as C. tifferi) – Costa Rica to Honduras

References

Eumolpinae
Chrysomelidae genera
Beetles of Central America
Beetles of South America